Darut Changplook ( born 3 February 1988) is a Thai international footballer who plays as a defender. Changplook is a veteran player who is cool under pressure and is known for her strong play on the back-line of defense as well as her signature blue-dyed hair.

International goals

References

External links
 
 
 

1988 births
Living people
Women's association football defenders
Darut Changplook
2015 FIFA Women's World Cup players
Darut Changplook
Footballers at the 2006 Asian Games
Footballers at the 2010 Asian Games
Footballers at the 2014 Asian Games
Darut Changplook
Darut Changplook
Southeast Asian Games medalists in football
Competitors at the 2007 Southeast Asian Games
Darut Changplook
Darut Changplook
Darut Changplook